Bodyblock or body block may refer to:

Body block (professional wrestling) or shoulder block, a professional wrestling attack
Body Block, a historic building in Cleveland, Ohio, US
Blocking (American football), one player obstructing another player's path with their body

See also
 Body (disambiguation)
 Block (disambiguation)
 Blocking (disambiguation)